Lankenau Institute for Medical Research (LIMR), founded in 1927, is a nonprofit, biomedical research institute located on the campus of Lankenau Medical Center in Wynnewood, Pennsylvania, serving as the research division of the Main Line Health System in suburban Philadelphia. LIMR focuses on studies of cancer, cardiovascular, autoimmune, gastrointestinal and other diseases. It houses a center for population health research.

History 
LIMR was one of the first U.S. research institutes to focus on cancer when it was founded in 1927. It was formerly known as the Lankenau Hospital Research Institute (LHRI) until 1980 and the Lankenau Medical Research Center (LMRC) from 1981-1999.  Starting in 1941, LHRI also housed the Institute for Cancer Research (ICR), until the ICR was merged with the former American Oncology Hospital to create Fox Chase Cancer Center in 1974.

LHRI researcher David Hungerford is credited with the discovery of the first genetic abnormality in cancer, called the Philadelphia chromosome. It is detected in the vast majority of patients suffering from myelogenous leukemia. The first molecule-targeted drug to be created for cancer therapy, Gleevec (imatinib), acts by blocking this genetic abnormality.

LHRI researcher Baruch Blumberg is credited with the discovery of hepatitis B virus and a blood test to detect it, as recognized by the 1976 Nobel Prize for Physiology or Medicine.

LIMR carried out research into the role of IDO (indoleamine 2,3-dioxygenase) in cancer, including the first experimental therapeutics to directly inhibit this enzyme, which modifies inflammatory processes in cancer, autoimmune disease, retinopathy, cardiovascular disease and other disorders.

Background 
George C. Prendergast is the President and CEO of LIMR since 2004.

Grants and Awards 

National Institutes of Health (NIH) grant to Charles Antzelevitch for his proposal to develop new approaches for pharmacologic management of cardiac J Wave Syndromes.

U.S. Department of Defense (DOD) grant to Ellen Heber-Katz for her study on drug-induced tissue regeneration and re-innervation after limb amputation.

NIH grant to George Prendergast for his study: IDO2 targeting in pancreatic cancer.

DOD grant to Susan Gilmour for her study: Targeting increased polyamine transport in drug-resistant melanoma.

NIH grant to James Mullin for his study on the effects of the Ebola virus on the gastrointestinal tract.

NIH grant to Scott Dessain for his study: Anti-NDMA receptor antibodies from patients with limbic encephalitis.

NIH grant to Melvin Reichman for his study: New drug discovery paradigms for synucleinopathies.

Giorgi Family Foundation grant to Laura Mandik-Nayak for her study on defining the role of IDO2 as a treatment for rheumatoid arthritis.

References

External links
 

Medical research institutes in the United States
Independent research institutes
1927 establishments in Pennsylvania